Teatro Nacional (Spanish & Portuguese: "National Theatre") may refer to:

Argentina
Teatro Nacional Cervantes
Brazil
Teatro Nacional (Brasília) 
Costa Rica
Teatro Nacional (San José)
Cuba
National Theatre of Cuba
Dominican Republic
Teatro Nacional (Santo Domingo)
El Salvador
Teatro Nacional (San Salvador) 
Guatemala
Teatro Nacional: Centro Cultural Miguel Angel Asturias, Guatemala City
Mexico
Teatro Nacional (Mexico City)
Nicaragua
Teatro Nacional (Managua)
Panama
Teatro Nacional (Panama City)
Portugal
Teatro Nacional D. Maria II, Lisbon 
Teatro Nacional de São Carlos, Lisbon
Teatro Nacional São João, Oporto
Spain
Teatro Nacional María Guerrero, Madrid
National Theatre of Catalonia, Barcelona
Venezuela
National Theatre of Venezuela

See also